The Plan is a 2014 South Korean thriller film directed by Park Chang-jin.

Plot
Se-hee is a notoriously cold-blooded money-lender. In order to survive in the cruel business, she is not afraid to seduce a man, destroy a family, or take away collateral through underhanded means. By the time her name becomes known in the business, she has two men who are always by her side: financial sponsor In-ho, and adoring regular guy Yong-hoon.

One day, Se-hee comes across Min-young, a desperate but beautiful girl who reminds her of herself when she was young. Loan sharks had ruined Se-hee's family when she was a child, which made her decide to become one herself. Se-hee lures Min-young into her clan, and together they meticulously plan an act of revenge to take down the kingpin of the loan shark business.

Cast
 Shin Eun-kyung as Se-hee
 Han Ji-an as Se-hee (young)
 Oh In-hye as Min-young
 Kang Ji-sub as Yong-hoon
 Lee Ki-young as In-ho
 Choi Yong-min

References

External links 
 
 

2014 films
2010s Korean-language films
South Korean thriller films
2014 thriller films
2010s South Korean films